The 1984 Big Eight men's basketball tournament was held March 8–10 at a combination of on-campus gymnasiums and Kemper Arena in Kansas City, Missouri.

Second-seeded Kansas defeated top-seeded Oklahoma in the championship game, 79–78, to win the Big Eight men's basketball tournament.

The Jayhawks received an automatic bid to the 1984 NCAA tournament. They were joined in the tournament by fellow Big Eight member Oklahoma, who earned an at-large bid.

Format
All eight of the conference's members participated in the tournament field. They were seeded based on regular season conference records, with all teams placed and paired in the initial quarterfinal round.

All first-round games were played on the home court of the higher-seeded team. The semifinals and championship game were played at Kemper Arena in Kansas City, Missouri.

Bracket

References

Tournament
Big Eight Conference men's basketball tournament
Big Eight Conference men's basketball tournament
Big Eight Conference men's basketball tournament